Zygophylax is a genus of cnidarians belonging to the family Zygophylacidae.

They reproduce asexually and are carnivores.

The genus has almost cosmopolitan distribution.

Species
Species:

Zygophylax abyssicola 
Zygophylax adhaerens 
Zygophylax africana 
Zygophylax antipathes 
Zygophylax arborescens 
Zygophylax armata 
Zygophylax bathyphila 
Zygophylax biarmata 
Zygophylax bifurcata 
Zygophylax binematophoratus 
Zygophylax brevitheca 
Zygophylax brownei 
Zygophylax carolina 
Zygophylax cervicornis 
Zygophylax concinna 
Zygophylax convallaria 
Zygophylax crassicaulis
Zygophylax crassitheca
Zygophylax crozetensis 
Zygophylax curvitheca
Zygophylax cyathifera 
Zygophylax dispersa 
Zygophylax echinata 
Zygophylax elongata 
Zygophylax encarnae 
Zygophylax geminocarpa
Zygophylax geniculata 
Zygophylax infundibulum 
Zygophylax kakaiba 
Zygophylax kurilensis 
Zygophylax laertesi 
Zygophylax leloupi 
Zygophylax levinseni 
Zygophylax medeae 
Zygophylax millardae 
Zygophylax naomiae 
Zygophylax niger 
Zygophylax niobae 
Zygophylax pacifica 
Zygophylax parabiarmata 
Zygophylax parapacificus 
Zygophylax pinnata 
Zygophylax polycarpa 
Zygophylax profunda 
Zygophylax pseudafricanus 
Zygophylax pseudoabietinella 
Zygophylax reflexa 
Zygophylax robustus 
Zygophylax rufa 
Zygophylax sagamiensis 
Zygophylax sibogae 
Zygophylax stechowi 
Zygophylax tizardensis 
Zygophylax tottoni 
Zygophylax unilateralis 
Zygophylax valdiviae 
Zygophylax elegans 
Zygophylax junceoides 
Zygophylax recta 
Zygophylax chazaliei 
Zygophylax convallarius 
Zygophylax elegantula 
Zygophylax grandis 
Zygophylax inconstans  
Zygophylax operculata 
Zygophylax rigida

References

Zygophylacidae
Hydrozoan genera